Sunrise FM is a public radio station in Koforidua, the capital town of the Eastern region of Ghana. It is located in Effiduase a suburb of the Koforidua township. The station is owned and run by the state broadcaster, the Ghana Broadcasting Corporation.

References

Radio stations in Ghana
Mass media in Koforidua